Ashvin or Ashwin or Ashwan (Malay/Indonesian: Aswin; Thai: Asawin), also known as Aswayuja, is the seventh month of the lunisolar Hindu calendar, the solar Tamil calendar, where it is known as Aipassi, and the solar Indian national calendar. It is the sixth month of the solar Bengali calendar and the seventh of the lunar Indian calendar of the Deccan Plateau. It falls in the season of Shôrot (Hindi Sharad), or Autumn. In Vedic Jyotish, Ashwin begins with the Sun's enter into Virgo.

It overlaps with September and October of the Gregorian calendar and is the month in which Diwali, the festival of lights, is celebrated according to the amanta tradition (Diwali falls in Kartika according to the purnimanta tradition). In lunar religious calendars, Ashwin begins on the new moon or the full moon around the time of the September equinox.

Etymology
Ashvini is the first star that appears in the evening sky. In Indian astrology, it is the head of Aries, or the first of the 27 Nakshatra. Ashvin also stands for the divine twins, the Ashvins, the gods of vision, Ayurvedic medicine, the glow of sunrise and sunset, and the aversion of misfortune and sickness in Hindu mythology. Asawin is the Thai variant of Ashvin and stands for the warrior. The term is often translated into English as "knight". The Ashvins are described as representing the "blending of light and darkness" during the twilight period.

Festivals
Several major Hindu holidays take place in Ashvin. Those are as follows:
 Navaratri (1-9 lunar Ashvin)
 Durga Puja (6-10 lunar Ashvin)
 Saraswati Puja in South India (8-10 lunar Ashvin) 
 Vijayadashami or Dussehra (10 lunar Ashvin), the last day of Navaratri
 Kojagiri Poornima (15 lunar Ashvin)
 Diwali festival (amanta tradition), including Dhanteras (28 lunar Ashvin), Naraka Chaturdasi (29 lunar Ashvin) and Lakshmi Puja (30 lunar Ashvin)
 Kali Puja (new moon of lunar Ashvin), which is held as per the lunar calendar, usually falls in this month.

Regional variation
According to the latest revised calendar of Bangladesh, Ashwin now consists of 31 days instead of 30 days. This revision went into effect on 16 October 2019.

Ashwin is known as aipasi (ஐப்பசி) in Tamil and begins when the sun enters Libra in October.

It's also called kunwaar (कुँवार) month in eastern Uttar Pradesh & western Bihar state.

See also

 Astronomical basis of the Hindu calendar
Hindu astronomy
 Hindu units of measurement
 List of most popular given names
 Tishrei

References

Months of the Bengali calendar
07